The Lasco Lascondor (also frequently known by the misspelling "Lasconder") was a 1930s Australian 8-seat passenger and mail carrier aircraft built by the Larkin Aircraft Supply Company (Lasco) at Coode Island, Victoria. It is claimed to be the first multi-engined aircraft designed and built in the Southern Hemisphere.

History
Development of the Lascondor began in June 1928, concurrently with the company's Lascoter; the two aircraft had 90% commonality of structural parts. Like the Lascoter the Lascondor
was a high-wing monoplane with a tubular steel structure, featuring a tailwheel undercarriage and a fully enclosed cabin for the passengers and the pilot. A major change was the Lascondor's three Armstrong Siddeley Mongoose engines instead of the Lascoter's single more powerful Siddeley Puma engine. The Lascondor also had greater fuel capacity and a slightly longer fuselage with a redesigned cabin to accommodate an extra row of seats. In addition, while the Lascoter had two sets of flying controls in the cockpit the Lascondor had only one to allow for another passenger seat, giving an overall capacity of seven passengers and one pilot.

Operators

 Australian Aerial Services

Specifications

References

1920s Australian airliners
Trimotors
Lascondor
High-wing aircraft